MS Nautica is a cruise ship, built for Renaissance Cruises as part of their . Nautica is now owned and operated by Oceania Cruises, where she is part of their Regatta Class. She was built in 2000 by the Chantiers de l'Atlantique shipyard in Saint-Nazaire, France, for Renaissance Cruises as MS R Five. Between 2002 and 2004 she sailed for Pullmantur Cruises before entering service with her current owners in 2005.

On 30 November 2008 while sailing on the Gulf of Aden the Nautica came under attack by Somali pirates, but was able to escape without any injuries to passenger or crew.

On 20 September 2018, during Storm Ali, the Nautica broke free from her moorings at Greenock in Scotland at the height of the tempest leaving holidaymakers stranded.

Concept and construction

R Five was the fifth ship in a series of eight identical cruise ships built between 1998 and 2001 by Chantiers de l'Atlantique at Saint-Nazaire, France, for Renaissance Cruises. Her keel was laid on 22 March 1999 and she was launched from drydock on 31 July 1999. Following fitting out, the R Five was delivered to Renaissance Cruises on 29 January 2000.

Service history

On 1 February 2000 the R Five entered service with Renaissance Cruises on cruises in the Mediterranean. She stayed in service until 25 September 2001, when Renaissance Cruises was declared bankrupt due to financial difficulties caused by the September 11 attacks. Alongside six of her sister ships the R Five was laid up at Gibraltar. In December 2001 she was sold to the France-based Cruiseinvest and alongside her sisters was moved to Marseille, France, for a further lay-up.

From June 2002 the R Five was chartered to the Spain-based Pullmantur Cruises for cruising for the Spanish market. In service with Pullmantur she was marketed under the name "Blue Dream", but her registered name remained unchanged. During the northern hemisphere winter seasons she sailed out of Brazilian port as a part of Pullmantur's joint service with CVC. R Five left service with Pullmantur in 2004.

In November 2005 the R Five re-entered service when she was chartered to Oceania Cruises and renamed Nautica. On 30 November 2008 the Nautica was sailing from Safaga, Egypt, to Salah, Oman, on the Maritime Safety Protection Area established in the Gulf of Aden due to persistent pirate attacks on the area, when at approximately 9:28 AM UTC+3 the ship encountered two Somali pirate skiffs. Captain Jurica Brajcic ordered the ship to take evasive manoeuvres and to sail away at flank speed. The Nautica was able to outrun her attackers, although the ship was fired at eight times. None of the 684 passengers or 401 crew on board were injured in the attack. Following the attack the Nautica proceeded normally to her next scheduled port of call.

Nautica is scheduled to undergo a significant renovation in June 2020 as a part of the company's $100 million OceaniaNEXT program.

References

External links

Official website

Cruise ships
Ships built in France
Piracy in Somalia
1999 ships